Sekolah Menengah Kebangsaan Convent or Convent Secondary School is in the municipality of Alor Setar, state of Kedah, in Malaysia. It is one of the 30 Convent secondary schools in Malaysia.

References

Alor Setar
Schools in Kedah
Secondary schools in Malaysia